Statistical Applications in Genetics and Molecular Biology is a bimonthly peer-reviewed scientific journal covering the application of statistics to problems in computational biology. It was established in 2002 and is published by de Gruyter. The editor-in-chief is Guido Sanguinetti. According to the Journal Citation Reports, the journal has a 2012 impact factor of 1.717.

Abstracting and indexing
The journal is abstracted and indexed in:
Current Index to Statistics
MEDLINE
Science Citation Index Expanded
Zentralblatt MATH

References

External links
 

Biostatistics journals
Statistics journals
Publications established in 2002
Delayed open access journals
English-language journals
Bioinformatics and computational biology journals
De Gruyter academic journals